Qarah Su Rural District may refer to:
Qarah Su Rural District (Meshgin Shahr County), Ardabil province
Qarah Su Rural District (Kermanshah Province)
Qarah Su Rural District (Khoy County), West Azerbaijan province
Qarah Su Rural District (Maku County), West Azerbaijan province